Mogens Niels Juel Camre (29 March 1936 – 5 December 2016) was a Danish politician and Member of the European Parliament with the Danish People's Party (Danish: Dansk Folkeparti), a Vice-Chairman of the Union for a Europe of Nations and sat on the European Parliament's Committee on Budgetary Control and its Committee on Employment and Social Affairs.

He was also substitute for the Committee on Constitutional Affairs.

Controversy 
Camre made statements on several occasions which occasioned controversy. Among other things, he stated that   This statement was interpreted by several other MEPs, among them Hannes Swoboda, an Austrian Social-Democrat and Renate Weber, a Romanian MEP, to mean that Camre had stated that Danes were more clever than Bulgarians and Romanians.

On 13 November 2007 he was elected to the Danish parliament, but only two days later announced that he declined his seat in parliament because it would mean that he couldn't finish his term in the European Parliament.

Education
 1961: Bachelor of commerce (accountancy)
 1967: Master's degree in political and economic science

Career
 1967-1968 and 1987-1995: Civil servant, Budget Department of Finance Ministry
 1974-1989: Member of Tax Tribunal
 since 1980: Chairman of the Board of KTAS (1982-1992) and board member of a number of other companies
 1985-1987: Member of the Board of Governors of Denmark's National Bank
 1995-1999: Budgetary Adviser with Denmark's Permanent Representation to the EU
 1962-1966 and 1968-1987: Member of Executive Social Democratic Party in Copenhagen
 1967-1968 and 1981-1982: Member of National Executive of Social Democratic Party
 1981-1982: Member of Danish TUC's Executive Committee
 1981-1982: Member of the Executive Committee of the Labour Movement's Economic Council
 1968-1987: Member of the Folketing
 Member of several Folketing committees, including the Political and Economic Affairs Committee
 Chairman of the Folketing's Environment and Planning Committee
 Vice-Chairman of the Folketing's Market Relations and Finance Committees
 since 1999: Member of the European Parliament
 since 1999: Vice-Chairman of the Union for Europe of the Nations Group

Quotes

Mogens Camre, Danish People's Party's annual meeting (September 16, 2001):

See also
2004 European Parliament election in Denmark

Notes

External links

 
 
 

1936 births
2016 deaths
Members of the Folketing 1968–1971
Members of the Folketing 1971–1973
Members of the Folketing 1973–1975
Members of the Folketing 1975–1977
Members of the Folketing 1977–1979
Members of the Folketing 1979–1981
Members of the Folketing 1981–1984
Members of the Folketing 1984–1987
Members of the Folketing 2007–2011
People from Randers
Danish People's Party MEPs
MEPs for Denmark 2004–2009
MEPs for Denmark 1999–2004
People convicted of racial hatred offences